Lyriothemis is a genus of dragonfly in the family Libellulidae and belong to the suborder Anisoptera, found in eastern Asia. Some members of this genus lay their eggs in water-filled crevices and holes in trees and fallen logs.

Species
The genus contains the following species:

References

Libellulidae
Anisoptera genera
Taxa named by Friedrich Moritz Brauer
Taxonomy articles created by Polbot